The term Sea of Trees most commonly refers to Aokigahara, a forest in Japan. The term may also refer to:
"Sea of Trees", a song by King Gizzard & the Lizard Wizard from the 2012 album 12 Bar Bruise
"Sea of Trees", a song by God Is an Astronaut from the 2015 album Helios / Erebus
The Sea of Trees, a 2015 film